Dr.Ambedkar Nagar Dhadday(G SQUARE DESIGN , G SQUARE ENTERPRISE) is a village near Lakhpur Tehsil Phagwara, Kapurthala district, in Punjab, India.

Demographics
According to the 2001 Census, Dhadday has a population of 1,068 people. Neighbouring villages include Lakhpur, Bir Dhadoli, Dhadoli, Chak Prema, Wariah, Gulabgarh, Khatti, and Sangatpur. The nearest police station is at Rawalpindi and Phagwara.
Not far from the village, a military airfield was successfully constructed in 2000. Small planes land and take off from the airfield daily which can be visibly seen from rooftops in the village. The postal code for the village is 144407 and main post office is at Rawal Pindi.

References

Villages in Kapurthala district